Thomas Condon: Portrait of Condon, also known as Thomas Condon Medallion, is a hammered copped sheet sculpture depicting Thomas Condon by Wayne Chabre, installed on the exterior of the University of Oregon's Geology Building, in Eugene, Oregon, United States. It was surveyed by the Smithsonian Institution's "Save Outdoor Sculpture!" program in 1993.

See also

 1989 in art

References

1989 establishments in Oregon
1989 sculptures
Copper sculptures in Oregon
Outdoor sculptures in Eugene, Oregon
Sculptures by Wayne Chabre
Sculptures of men in Oregon
University of Oregon campus